Miha Štricelj (born 6.6.1974 in Tacen) is a Slovenian slalom canoeist who competed at the international level from 1990 to 1999.

He won a silver medal in the K1 team event at the 1999 ICF Canoe Slalom World Championships in La Seu d'Urgell and also at the 1996 European Championships in Augsburg

World Cup individual podiums

References

Living people
Slovenian male canoeists
1974 births
Medalists at the ICF Canoe Slalom World Championships